The Denver Post Tournament was organized in the 1920s to be "the World Series of semi-pro baseball." The event was sponsored by the Denver Post and featured ten invited teams. In 1934, Negro league players and Black players began to participate, starting with the Kansas City Monarchs and the Denver White Elephants. 

The tournament ended in the 1940s.

Participating players
Sammy Bankhead
Sammy Baugh
Cool Papa Bell
Josh Gibson
Lonnie Goldstein
Sammy Hale
Buster Haywood
Vic Harris
Rogers Hornsby
Sammy T. Hughes
Buck Leonard
Leroy Matlock
Satchel Paige
Pat Patterson
Bill Perkins
John Pickett
Felton Snow
Bill Wright

References

Defunct baseball competitions in the United States
Negro league baseball
1920s establishments in Colorado
1940s disestablishments in Colorado
Recurring sporting events established in the 1920s
Recurring sporting events disestablished in the 1940s
Baseball in Colorado